Tadrart is a village in Agadir-Ida Ou Tanane Prefecture in the Souss-Massa region of Morocco.

Between the censuses in 1994 and 2004 the population of the village fell from 5739 to 5703 inhabitants.

References 

Populated places in Agadir-Ida Ou Tanane Prefecture